Michael Griffin (born April 10, 1961) is an American escape artist, magician and illusionist. He is best known for his $100,000 worldwide challenge to anyone who can keep him prisoner, as well as being the only person to have survived a public hanging.

Early life

Griffin was born in Lexington, Kentucky.

Notable appearances
He had numerous appearances in the series Masters of Illusion and the Reelz series Extreme Escapes.

In 2012, Griffin was selected to appear on America's Got Talent. Originally scheduled to perform his Navy Sea Bag escape, producers at last minute suggested Griffin have Howard Stern come on stage and tie Michael up with rope. He made his escape but was not selected to continue.

Stunts
Griffin's first "stunt" to bring the escape artist attention occurred in Newport Beach, California. In front of assembled media and onlookers, he was chained up with 15 feet of iron chain secured with four padlocks.  He jumped from the bow of one of two yachts used and was able to escape within 30 seconds.

During a concert appearance in Cincinnati, Ohio, Griffin sought to disprove the myth that Houdini escaped from under the ice in the Detroit River. A hole was cut into the ice off the dock of the Mike Fink restaurant on the Covington, Kentucky side of the Ohio river. He was locked up with three pairs of police handcuffs and 1 set of leg irons before disappearing beneath the ice, appearing free approx 30 seconds later.

During a show for the prisoners at the Sedgwick County Jail in Wichita, Kansas, Griffin was restrained in 14 pairs of handcuffs and 6 leg irons then secured into an isolation cell. The escape was accomplished in 8 minutes and a sworn certificate signed by the Sheriff attesting to the facts of the escape was given to Griffin. During a three-day appearance at the Sandusky County Fair Griffin in Fremont, Ohio, Griffin was challenged by the Nopper-Veh Funeral Home to escape from a metal coffin designed with an airtight seal. He succeeded in escaping in under 11 minutes. He became the first magician to be granted the use of Houdini's underwater packing box which had been in dry storage for approximately 90 years. Griffin was allowed to examine it and decide to accept or decline the challenge. The escape was successful, but almost cost him his life.

Public Hanging
In January 1984, Griffin attempted to recreate a stunt he had originally performed in Houston, Texas on September 29, 1983. During this attempt a regulation 13 knot noose was used and applied by the Sheriff of Sedgwick County, Kansas (Johnny Darr) as well as tying Griffin's hands behind his back. He made his escape in approximately 37 seconds. According to Griffin "The pain was unbearable, I thought I was dying".

$10,000.00 Challenge Escape
Griffin had issued a challenge to reward $10,000.00 to anyone who could keep him prisoner.

Awards and nominations
 1993 Best Escape Artist, World Magic Awards (Award)
 1999 Best Escape Artist, World Magic Awards (Award)
 2004 Silver Handcuffs, World Escape Artist Convention (Award)

References

External links
Official Website
 

1961 births
American magicians
Living people
Escapologists
People from Lexington, Kentucky
People from Lake Arrowhead, California